The 1933–34 Boston Bruins season was the Bruins' tenth season in the NHL. The team placed last in the American Division and missed the playoffs.

Offseason

Regular season

Final standings

Record vs. opponents

Schedule and results

Playoffs
The Boston Bruins did not qualify for the playoffs.

Player statistics

Regular season
Scoring

Goaltending

Awards and records

Transactions

See also
1933–34 NHL season

References

External links

Boston Bruins seasons
Boston
Boston
Boston Bruins
Boston Bruins
1930s in Boston